Norwood is a masculine given name which may refer to:

 Norwood Bowne (1813-1890), American newspaper editor and politician
 Norwood Creason (1918–2009), American politician from Missouri
 Norwood Hallowell (1909–1979), American middle-distance runner who competed in the 1932 Olympics
 Norwood Russell Hanson (1924–1967), American philosopher of science
 Norwood Sothoron (1911–2005), American multi-sport college athlete
 Norwood Carlton Tilley Jr. (born 1943), United States federal judge

Masculine given names